Parataenia is a genus of beetles in the family Buprestidae, containing the following species:

 Parataenia aeneonigra Kerremans, 1909
 Parataenia chrysochlora (Palisot de Beauvois, 1805)
 Parataenia fairmairei Kerremans, 1898
 Parataenia fugax Harold, 1878
 Parataenia orbicularis Kerremans, 1892
 Parataenia simplicicollis Kerremans, 1892

References

Buprestidae genera